Luciano da Silva may refer to:

Luciano José Pereira da Silva (born 1980), Brazilian footballer
Luciano da Silva (Triguinho) (born 1979), Brazilian footballer